UFCW Local 1776 represents workers in Philadelphia and the surrounding suburbs for the United Food and Commercial Workers.  The larger majority of their members work in grocery stores. The number 1776 refers to the historical date in Philadelphia rather than it being a sequential number of local unions.

History
In 1937, The Retail Clerks & Managers Protective Association (retail clerks) Local 1357 was founded in Philadelphia by employees of American Stores and A&P. In 1963, Local 1357 of the retail clerks had 4,000 members in Philadelphia area supermarkets. By the end of the decade, through the organizing power of president Wendell Young III over 10,000 non-food retail workers and department store employees joined Local 1357.

In 1971, Pennsylvania State Liquor Store clerks joined the ranks of the expanding union. In 1979 the Retail Clerks International Association had merged with the Amalgamated Meat Cutters to create the United Food and Commercial Workers (UFCW) International Union.

Notable representations
Retail food
Acme Markets
Rite Aid
ShopRite
Super Fresh Food Markets

References

External links
United Food and Commercial Workers Union International
UFCW Local 1776
Liquor Control Board worker contract may discourage privatization
New contract may scuttle effort to privatize Pa. liquor sales
Washington State Auction Should End Privatization Debate
UFCW Local 1776 President Wendell Young speaks out against the privatization of PA Wine & Spirits Stores on FOX29 News
Do the Lessons of Washington State’s Liquor License Auction Apply to PA?
The Wine and Spirit of ’76: How the UFCW Local 1776 Defeated the Privateers
UFCW Local 1776 John Meyerson and Philadelphia rally seeks to boost spirits of unions under siege

Trade unions established in 1937
Retail clerks
United Food and Commercial Workers